Bratt pans are large cooking receptacles designed for producing large-scale meals. They are typically used for braising, searing, shallow frying and general cooking. The units feature either manual or electrical tilting.

See also
 List of cooking vessels

References

Cookware and bakeware